Joeli Vidiri (23 November 1973 – 23 February 2022) was a Fijian rugby union footballer who also played for the New Zealand All Blacks.  He played as a wing.

Career
Vidiri studied at Queen Victoria School (Fiji). He represented Fiji in both 15s and sevens before coming to New Zealand in 1994. He played for the Auckland Blues in the Super 12 competition and represented Counties Manukau in the NPC. He only managed to play two tests for New Zealand in 1998. In 2001 he was diagnosed with a kidney illness and placed on dialysis treatment like his fellow Auckland Blues winger Jonah Lomu.

Vidiri played in the Super 12 for the Auckland Blues from 1996 until 2001, where he scored 43 tries in 61 games, at the time an individual record. In 2000 Joeli created the record for most tries scored in one match scoring four against the Bulls, a record which has since been broken when Sean Wainui scored five tries against the Waratahs in 2021. He had a song named after him (Give Me Hope Joeli) that was very popular with the Auckland Blues fans at home games at Eden Park. He appeared in only five Super 12 matches in 2001, with his illness impacting on his ability to play. In 2000 Vidiri played for the Barbarian F.C. against Leicester Tigers. Vidiri made 71 provincial appearances for Counties, for whom Vidiri scored 56 tries. After two early matches with Auckland in the 2001 NPC, he ended his career.

Post career
After his career was cut short, it was revealed that Vidiri had been waiting on a transplant for over a decade (accurate to 2013), and on 8 April 2013 episode of Campbell Live, it had been revealed he was talked out of a kidney transplant in 2008, and had taken himself out of the waiting list due to his mother's scepticism and traditional views against transplants and surgery.  He worked in Pukekohe.

Vidiri died on 23 February 2022, at the age of 48, in Sacramento, California, from complications of COVID-19 during the COVID-19 pandemic in California, shortly after getting married. He was unvaccinated. Tributes from the Rugby community were shared through the New Zealand media.

References

External links
 

1973 births
2022 deaths
People from Nadroga-Navosa Province
Fijian rugby union players
Blues (Super Rugby) players
Counties Manukau rugby union players
Auckland rugby union players
Rugby union wings
New Zealand international rugby union players
Barbarian F.C. players
Commonwealth Games gold medallists for New Zealand
Fiji international rugby union players
Fijian emigrants to New Zealand
Fijian expatriate rugby union players
New Zealand expatriate rugby union players
Expatriate rugby union players in England
Fijian expatriate sportspeople in England
New Zealand expatriate sportspeople in England
New Zealand people of I-Taukei Fijian descent
New Zealand international rugby sevens players
New Zealand male rugby sevens players
Commonwealth Games rugby sevens players of New Zealand
Rugby sevens players at the 1998 Commonwealth Games
Commonwealth Games medallists in rugby sevens
Deaths from the COVID-19 pandemic in California
Medallists at the 1998 Commonwealth Games